The New York International Latino Film Festival is a major Hispanic film festival located in New York City. The festival features over sixty films, shorts, and documentaries over the course of six days, along with other events focused on Latino culture.

List of award winners by year

2008
 Best Picture - Vicious Circle - Director: Paul Boyd
 Best Documentary Award - Transvestites Also Cry - Director: Sebastiano D'Ayala Valva
 Best Documentary Award - La Americana -Directors: Nicholas Bruckman & John Mattiuzzi
 Best Short Award - Rojo Red - Director: Juan Manuel Betancourt
 Heineken Red Star Award - Malta Con Huevo - Director: Cristobal Valderrama

2009
 Best Film - Inside a Change - Director: Rik Cordero
 Best Short Film - Lalo  - Director: Daniel Maldonado
 Audience Choice Award:  Best Picture - El Regalo de la Pachamama - Director:  Toshifumi Matsushita
 Best Documentary - Stages  - Directors: Meerkat Media Collective

2010
 Best Domestic Feature - Forged - Director: William Wedig
 Best Short Film - Career Day - Director: Ivette Garcia Davila
 Best International Feature - Habana Eva - Director: Fina Torres
 Best Director - 25 KILATES (25 CARAT) - Director: Patxi Amezcua
 Best Documentary - So Far - Director: Stephanie LaMorre

2011
 Best Short Film- La Ducha (The Shower) - Director: Jose Maria San Martin
 Best U.S. Feature Film - Maria My Love - Director/Writer: Jasmine McGlade Chazelle
 Best International Feature Film - El Regreso (The Return) - Director/Writer: Hernán Jiménez
 Best Director - Blacktino - Director/Writer: Aaron Burns
 Best Documentary - El Edificio de los Chilenos (The Chilean Building) - Director/: Macarena Aguilo Marchi & Susana Foxley

References

External links
 Official website for the New York International Latino Film Festival

Film festivals in New York City
Latin American cinema
Latin American film festivals
Hispanic and Latino American culture in New York City